Jennifer Pharr Davis is a long distance hiker from the United States of America who serves on the President's Council for Sports, Fitness, and Nutrition. She has been called "the Serena Williams of long distance hiking" by Baratunde Thurston (PBS America Outdoors) and is also an author, speaker, National Geographic Adventurer of the Year, and Ambassador for the American Hiking Society. She has hiked over 14,000 miles on six different continents, including thru-hikes on the Pacific Crest Trail, the Appalachian Trail (three times), the Colorado Trail, the Long Trail in Vermont, the Bibbulmun Track in Australia, and numerous trails in Europe and South America (e.g., the Tour du Mont Blanc, West Highland Way, Laugavegur, GR 11 (Spain), GR 20, and the Pembrokeshire Coast Path, Cotahuasi Canyon and the Inca Trail.

Pharr Davis lives in Asheville, North Carolina with her husband Brew, their daughter Charley, and son Gus. She attended Hendersonville High School (North Carolina) and the Asheville School. She first hiked the Appalachian Trail in 2005 after graduating from  Samford University. To prepare for her initial hike, she attended a class taught by Warren Doyle at the Appalachian Trail Institute. She had previously set the Long Trail trail record in 7 days and 15 hours in 2007. She also established the fastest known time on the Bibbulmun Track in Western Australia in 2008.

In 2011, Pharr Davis set the fastest known time on the Appalachian Trail completing it in 46 days, 11 hours and 20 minutes.  In  2015, Scott Jurek finished 3 hours and 12 minutes faster. New records have subsequently been set by Karl Meltzer, Joe McConaughy, and most recently Karel Sabbe.

Pharr Davis has written a number of books. She has written two guidebooks about hiking in the Charlotte, North Carolina area, and one about hiking near Asheville, North Carolina. She has also written two memoirs- 2010's Becoming Odyssa, about her 2005 Appalachian Trail thru-hike, and 2013's Called Again, about her record setting A.T. hike, both published by Beaufort Books.  Jennifer has also written 2017's Families on Foot and 2018's The Pursuit of Endurance  as well as 2019's "I Come From a Place" with celebrated watercolorist Alan Shuptrine, from Chattanooga, Tennessee.

As a member of the National Speakers Association, Pharr Davis has shared her trail lessons hundreds of times throughout the United States, Canada, and Europe, including presentations to Fortune 500 companies, trade organizations, colleges and universities, K-12 schools, libraries, festivals, churches, and other non-profits. She has been featured in the New York Times, the Washington Post, NPR's Talk of the Nation, and The Early Show on CBS. Her articles have appeared in print and online editions for the New York Times, Outside Magazine, Trail Runner, Backpacker, and Guideposts.

In 2008, Pharr Davis founded Blue Ridge Hiking Company, with the belief that "the trail is there for everyone at every phase of life" and with the goal of getting people outdoors on their own terms. The company leads half-day, full day and overnight trips in the Blue Ridge Mountains surrounding Asheville.

Pharr Davis served as a board member for the Appalachian Trail Conservancy, received a 2016 Laurel Wreath Award for athletic achievement from the Governor of North Carolina and was recognized as 2019 "Female Entrepreneur of the Year" by the Chamber of Commerce in Asheville, North Carolina. She was also named one of the 25 Most Adventurous Women of the Past 25 Years by Men's Journal, Blue Ridge Outdoors Magazine's Person of the Year in 2008 and her record-setting 2011 A.T. hike was named "Performance of the Year" by Ultrarunning Magazine.

In 2012, Pharr Davis hiked 600 miles on the Laugavegur Trail in Iceland and the GR 11 (Spain) across the Pyrenees in her second and third trimesters while pregnant with her daughter Charley. While on an 18-month book tour, Pharr Davis and her husband Brew took Charley hiking in all 50 states before their daughter turned two.

In 2017, she hiked the 1,175 mile Mountains to Sea Trail in partnership with the Friends of the Mountains to Sea Trail for the trail's 40th anniversary and completed the hike while still nursing her newborn Gus.

In recent years, Pharr Davis has hiked other long distance trails including the Pinhoti Trail, the Bartram Trail, the Foothills Trail, the Art Loeb Trail, and the Benton Mackaye Trail. She is also hiking the Continental Divide Trail in sections through the Rocky Mountains.

References

External links
 Official website

Samford University alumni
Sportspeople from Asheville, North Carolina
Living people
Hikers
1983 births